Kevin John Russell (born 6 December 1966) is an English former professional footballer who played as a striker for Brighton & Hove Albion, Portsmouth, Wrexham, Leicester City, Peterborough United, Cardiff City, Hereford United, Stoke City, Burnley, AFC Bournemouth and Notts County.

Playing career
Kevin Russell was a professional footballer and former England Youth international. During a career spanning twenty years he played for eleven clubs. Due to his quiff hairstyle Russell was nicknamed "Rooster" early on in his career; ironically he would lose all his hair in his youth and was bald for much of his playing days. Released by Brighton after an apprenticeship Russell returned to his hometown club Portsmouth but appearances were limited He then moved on to Wrexham during the 1987 close season. In the first of his two spells with the club he scored at a rate of just over a goal every two games. In 1989, he joined Leicester City, but was loaned out four times. However, he fought his way into the first team at the end of the 1991–92 season and became a cult-hero, scoring several important late goals after coming off the bench as he helped fire Leicester to the play-off final, eventually losing to Blackburn Rovers. Despite this, he went to Stoke City at the end of the season. While at Stoke he became a key member of the first team as Stoke won the Second Division title in 1992–93.

After one season at Stoke City, he moved onto Burnley for a fee of £130,000. Short spells with AFC Bournemouth and Notts County followed before a move back to the Racecourse Ground. Here, at last, Russell found a permanent home – he was to play nearly 200 more league games for The Robins in a deeper role, eventually being rewarded with a testimonial against Manchester United. In his second spell at Wrexham, he was best remembered for his winning goal against West Ham in an FA Cup third round replay in the 1996–97 season. With the tie goalless, Russell scored a 90th-minute goal to dump West Ham out of the cup at Upton Park.

Coaching career
He remained at the club as a coach until being sacked in January 2007. On 12 January 2011, he agreed to rejoin Peterborough United, with Darren Ferguson for a second spell. On 18 August 2014, it was confirmed that he rejoined Stoke City as a coach for the Under 21 and Under 18 sides. He was promoted to Stoke City U23s manager for the 2018–19 season. In January 2019 he began work, alongside Andy Quy, assisting Stoke's new caretaker manager Rory Delap.

Career statistics
Source:

A.  The "Other" column constitutes appearances and goals in the Football League Trophy, Football League play-offs and Full Members Cup.

Honours
 Stoke City
 Football League Second Division: 1992–93

 Burnley
 Football League Second Division play-offs: 1994

Individual
PFA Team of the Year: 1988–89 Fourth Division

References

External links
 

1966 births
Living people
People from Paulsgrove
Portsmouth F.C. players
Wrexham A.F.C. players
Leicester City F.C. players
Peterborough United F.C. players
Cardiff City F.C. players
Hereford United F.C. players
Stoke City F.C. players
Burnley F.C. players
AFC Bournemouth players
Notts County F.C. players
England youth international footballers
Peterborough United F.C. non-playing staff
Preston North End F.C. non-playing staff
English Football League players
Stoke City F.C. non-playing staff
Association football forwards
English footballers